Guri is a Local Government Area of Jigawa State, Nigeria. Its headquarters are in the town of Guri.
 
It has an area of 1,060 km and a population of 115,018 at the 2006 census.

The postal code of the area is 731.

The Bade language is spoken in Guri LGA.

References

Local Government Areas in Jigawa State